The flag of Mon State depicts a hamsa in the centre of a red background. The current flag was approved by the Mon State Hluttaw and officially adopted on 8 June 2018.

In local legend, the city of Bago, which was founded by the Mon people, was established on the location where a hamsa sought refuge during a massive flood, hence the adoption of the bird on the flag.

Former flag 
The former flag of Mon State, used until the adoption of the current flag on 8 June 2018, depicted a hamsa on a dark blue background and had "Mon State" written underneath it. The flag of Bago Region is very similar to the former flag of Mon State, but its hamsa and text have different proportions and designs.

References 

Mon State
Flags of Myanmar
Mon
Mon State
Flags displaying animals